Babuneh-ye Olya (also Romanized as Bābūneh-ye ‘Olyā) is a village in Charuymaq-e Jonubesharqi Rural District, Shadian District, Charuymaq County, East Azerbaijan Province, Iran. At the 2006 census, its population was 44, in 8 families. it is located beside the Aydoghmush river. this village is well-known for its apple gardens. to the south and north this village is limited respectively to Qochahmad and Ara-Babinə. residents of Babune speak Azeri-Turkish.

References 

Populated places in Charuymaq County